Roasio is a comune (municipality) in the Province of Vercelli in the Italian region Piedmont, located about  northeast of Turin and about  northwest of Vercelli.

The municipality of Roasio contains the frazioni (subdivisions, mainly villages and hamlets) San Maurizio, Castelletto Villa, San Giorgio, Sant' Eusebio, Corticella, Curavecchia, and Prucengo.

Roasio borders the following municipalities: Brusnengo, Curino, Gattinara, Lozzolo, Rovasenda, Sostegno, and Villa del Bosco.

Demographic evolution

References

External links
 www.comune.roasio.vc.it/

Cities and towns in Piedmont